Compsolechia abolitella is a moth of the family Gelechiidae. It was described by Francis Walker in 1864. It was described from Australia.

Adults are dark cupreous, cinereous (ash grey) beneath, with cinereous hindwings.

References

Moths described in 1864
Compsolechia
Taxa named by Francis Walker (entomologist)